Henry Jones Jr. (July 31, 1918 – May 16, 2010) was an American jazz pianist, bandleader, arranger, and composer. Critics and musicians described Jones as eloquent, lyrical, and impeccable. In 1989, The National Endowment for the Arts honored him with the NEA Jazz Masters Award. He was also honored in 2003 with the American Society of Composers, Authors, and Publishers (ASCAP) Jazz Living Legend Award. In 2008, he was awarded the National Medal of Arts. On April 13, 2009, the University of Hartford presented Jones with an honorary Doctorate of Music for his musical accomplishments.

Jones recorded more than 60 albums under his own name, and countless others as a sideman, including Cannonball Adderley's celebrated album Somethin' Else. On May 19, 1962, he played piano as actress Marilyn Monroe sang her famous "Happy Birthday, Mr. President" song to then U.S. president John F. Kennedy.

Biography
Born in Vicksburg, Mississippi, Henry "Hank" Jones moved to Pontiac, Michigan, where his father, Henry Jones Sr., a Baptist deacon and lumber inspector, bought a three-story brick home. One of seven children, Jones was raised in a musical family. His mother Olivia Jones sang; his two older sisters studied piano; and his two younger brothers—Thad, a trumpeter, and Elvin, a drummer—also became prominent jazz musicians. He studied piano at an early age and came under the influence of Earl Hines, Fats Waller, Teddy Wilson, and Art Tatum. By the age of 13, Jones was performing locally in Michigan and Ohio. While playing with territory bands in Grand Rapids and Lansing in 1944, he met Lucky Thompson, who invited Jones to work in New York City at the Onyx Club with Hot Lips Page.

In New York City, Jones regularly listened to leading bop musicians, and was inspired to master the new style. While practicing and studying the music he worked with John Kirby, Howard McGhee, Coleman Hawkins, Andy Kirk, and Billy Eckstine. In autumn 1947, he began touring in Norman Granz's Jazz at the Philharmonic package, and from 1948 to 1953 he was accompanist for Ella Fitzgerald, and accompanying her in England in the fall of 1948, developed a harmonic facility of extraordinary taste and sophistication. During this period he also made several historically important recordings with Charlie Parker, which included "The Song Is You", from the Now's the Time album, recorded in December 1952, with Teddy Kotick on bass and Max Roach on drums.

Engagements with Artie Shaw and Benny Goodman followed, and recordings with artists such as Lester Young, Cannonball Adderley, and Wes Montgomery, in addition to being for a time, "house pianist" on the Savoy label. From 1959 through 1975 Jones was staff pianist for CBS studios. This included backing guests such as Frank Sinatra on The Ed Sullivan Show. He played the piano accompaniment to Marilyn Monroe as she sang "Happy Birthday Mr. President" to John F. Kennedy on May 19, 1962. By the late 1970s, his involvement as pianist and conductor with the Broadway musical Ain't Misbehavin' (based on the music of Fats Waller) had informed a wider audience of his unique qualities as a musician.

During the late 1970s and the 1980s, Jones continued to record prolifically, as an unaccompanied soloist, in duos with other pianists (including John Lewis and Tommy Flanagan), and with various small ensembles, most notably the Great Jazz Trio. The group took this name in 1976, by which time Jones had already begun working at the Village Vanguard with its original members, Ron Carter and Tony Williams (it was Buster Williams rather than Carter, however, who took part in the trio's first recording session in 1976); by 1980 Jones' sidemen were Eddie Gómez and Al Foster, and in 1982 Jimmy Cobb replaced Foster. The trio also recorded with other all-star personnel, such as Art Farmer, Benny Golson, and Nancy Wilson. In the early 1980s Jones held a residency as a solo pianist at the Cafe Ziegfeld and made a tour of Japan, where he performed and recorded with George Duvivier and Sonny Stitt. Jones' versatility was more in evidence with the passage of time. He collaborated on recordings of Afro-pop with an ensemble from Mali and on an album of spirituals, hymns and folksongs with Charlie Haden called Steal Away (1995).

Among his later recordings are For My Father (2005), with bassist George Mraz and drummer Dennis Mackrel, a solo piano recording issued in Japan under the title Round Midnight (2006), and as a side man on Joe Lovano's Joyous Encounter (2005). Jones made his debut on Lineage Records, recording with Frank Wess and with the guitarist Eddie Diehl, but also appeared on West of 5th (2006) with Jimmy Cobb and Christian McBride on Chesky Records. He also accompanied Diana Krall for "Dream a Little Dream of Me" on the album compilation, We all Love Ella (Verve 2007). He is one of the musicians who test and talk about the piano in the documentary Note by Note: The Making of Steinway L1037, released in November 2007.

In early 2000, the Hank Jones Quartet accompanied jazz singer Salena Jones at the Lionel Hampton Jazz Festival in Idaho, and in 2006 at the Monterey Jazz Festival with both jazz singer Roberta Gambarini and the Oscar Peterson Trio.

In June 2005, Jones was awarded an Honorary Doctorate of Music from Berklee College of Music at 20th anniversary of jazz education at the Umbria Jazz Festival, in Perugia, Italy.

Hank Jones lived in Cresskill, NJ, upstate New York and in Manhattan. He died at a Calvary Hospital Hospice in The Bronx, New York, on May 16, 2010, survived by his wife Theodosia.

Awards and recognitions
Grammy history
Career Wins: 2009: Lifetime Achievement Grammy
Career Nominations: 5

Discography

References

External links 

 
 Hank Jones complete discography
 Arnold Jay Smith, "Profile: Hank Jones", Jazz.com.
 "Magic Numbers: Hank Jones, Ron Carter, Tony Williams" by Ethan Iverson.

 Hank Jones recordings at the Discography of American Historical Recordings.

1918 births
2010 deaths
Musicians from Vicksburg, Mississippi
Musicians from Pontiac, Michigan
Swing pianists
Bebop pianists
African-American pianists
American jazz pianists
American male pianists
American jazz composers
American male jazz composers
United States National Medal of Arts recipients
Savoy Records artists
Mercury Records artists
Verve Records artists
Muse Records artists
20th-century American pianists
Jazz musicians from Michigan
Jazz musicians from Mississippi
20th-century American male musicians
Black & Blue Records artists
20th-century African-American musicians
21st-century African-American people